The Soft Machine is a 1961 novel by William Burroughs. 

The Soft Machine may also refer to:

 Soft Machine, a British progressive rock band named for the novel
 The Soft Machine (Soft Machine album), 1968
 Soft Machine (Teddybears album), 2006
 The Soft Machine (Ozark Henry album), 2006